Daniela Comani (born 4 February 1965 in Bologna, Italy) is an Italian artist. Since 1989, she has lived in Berlin, Germany.

Biography

Comani received a Bachelor of Fine Arts degree from the Accademia di Belle Arti in Bologna, Italy (1988) and a Master of Fine Arts from the Universität der Künste in Berlin, Germany (1993).

The multimedia work of Comani touches on subjects like history, language, gender and identity. She often works with photos and texts from newspapers, television and books that allegedly appear familiar to us. Foreignness and intimacy, history and interpretation, and the mechanisms of comprehension are her concerns. Comani's artistic practice includes photography, texts, drawings, video and installation.

Exhibitions (selection)
 1992 – 37 Räume, Kunst-Werke Institute for Contemporary Art (KW), Berlin 
 1993 – More than zero, Magasin, Centre National d' Art Contemporain, Grenoble 
 1996 – Lesen, Kunsthalle St.Gallen, Switzerland
 2006 – Das Achte Feld – Geschlechter, Leben und Begehren in der Kunst seit 1960, Museum Ludwig, Cologne
 2007 – History will repeat itself, Kunst-Werke Institute for Contemporary Art (KW), Berlin 
 2007 – Ich war's, In 32 Tagen um den Alexanderplatz, NGBK / U2 Alexanderplatz, Berlin
 2008 – Transmediale 08 – conspire!, Haus der Kulturen der Welt, Berlin
 2008 – Bildpolitiken, Salzburger Kunstverein, Salzburg
 2008 – HeartQuake, Museum on the Seam, Jerusalem 
 2008 – Focus on Contemporary Italian Art, MAMbo – Museo d'Arte Moderna, Bologna
 2010 – Courier, University Art Museum, University at Albany, State University of New York
 2010 – C'était moi. Journal 1900–1999, Centre d'Art Passerelle, Brest
 2011 – 54. Biennale di Venezia / Repubblica di San Marino Pavilion, Venice 
 2011 – Doublespeak, Utah Museum of Contemporary Art, Salt Lake City, Utah
 2012 – Le Printemps de Septembre: History is Mine! Musée Les Abattoirs, Toulouse
 2013 – Authoritratti. Iscrizioni del femminile nell’arte italiana contemporanea, MAMbo – Museo d'Arte Moderna, Bologna

Artist books and publications (selection)
 Eine glückliche Ehe / Un matrimonio felice / A Happy Marriage, Edition Patrick Frey, Zürich, 2014, 
 My Film History – Daniela Comani's Top 100 Films, Revolver Publishing, Berlin, 2013, 
 Novità editoriali a cura di Daniela Comani, Maurizio Corraini s.r.l., Mantua, 2012, 
 Neuerscheinungen hrsg. von Daniela Comani, Edition Patrick Frey, Zürich, 2009, 
 It was me. Diary 1900–1999, Maurizio Corraini s.r.l., Mantua, 2007, 	
 Sono stata io. Diario 1900–1999, Maurizio Corraini s.r.l., Mantua, 2007, 
 comanicasino, REVOLVER Archiv für aktuelle Kunst, Frankfurt am Main, 2006, 
 Ich war’s. Tagebuch 1900–1999, REVOLVER Archiv für aktuelle Kunst, Frankfurt am Main, 2005, 
 Double Drawings, Vice Versa Verlag, Berlin, 2000,

References

Carolyn Kellogg, What if it were 'Mr. Dalloway'? Book covers revisited", Los Angeles Times, 20 May 2011

External links

1965 births
Living people
20th-century Italian women artists
21st-century Italian women artists
Accademia di Belle Arti di Bologna alumni
Artists from Bologna
Berlin University of the Arts alumni
Italian multimedia artists
Italian contemporary artists